Nebria belloti is a species of ground beetle in the Nebriinae subfamily that is endemic to Spain.

References

External links
Nebria belloti at Carabidae of the World

belloti
Beetles described in 1954
Beetles of Europe
Endemic fauna of Spain